The Dutch Basketball League Best Defender of the Year is an award that is yearly given to the best defensive player in the DBL, the highest professional basketball league in the Netherlands. The award is handed out after the regular season since 2013. The award is handed out by the FEB (Federatie Eredivisie Basketbal).

Winners

Awards won by nationality

Awards won by club

References

European basketball awards
Best Defender of the Year